Naso lopezi, the elongated unicornfish, is a unicornfish from the western Pacific Ocean. It occasionally makes its way into the aquarium trade.

References

Naso (fish)
Fish described in 1927